The Bodroux–Chichibabin aldehyde synthesis is a chemical reaction whereby a Grignard reagent is converted to an aldehyde one carbon longer.

Reaction of a Grignard reagent with triethyl orthoformate gives an acetal, which can be hydrolyzed to an aldehyde. For example, the synthesis of n-hexanal:

See also
Bouveault aldehyde synthesis

References

Carbon-carbon bond forming reactions
Name reactions
Formylation reactions